The 2001 Prince Edward Island Scott Tournament of Hearts was held January 19–23  at the Charlottetown Curling Club in Charlottetown, Prince Edward Island. The winning team was Team Shelly Bradley who represented Prince Edward Island, finished with a 7-4 round-robin record, losing the tiebreaker for a place in the semi-finals at the 2001 Scott Tournament of Hearts in Sudbury, Ontario.

Teams

Draw 1 
January 19, 3:00 PM AT

Draw 2 
January 19, 8:00 PM AT

Draw 3 
January 20, 2:00 PM AT

A Side Final 
January 20, 7:00 PM AT

Draw 4 
January 20, 7:00 PM AT

Draw 5 
January 21, 2:00 PM AT

B Side Final 
January 21, 7:00 PM AT

Draw 6 
January 21, 7:00 PM AT

Draw 7 
January 22, 2:00 PM AT

C Side Final 
January 22, 7:00 PM AT

Final 
January 23, 2:00 PM AT

References

Prince Edward Island Scott Tournament Of Hearts, 2001
Prince Edward Island Scott Tournament of Hearts
Prince Edward Island Scott Tournament of Hearts
Scotties Tournament of Hearts provincial tournaments
Curling competitions in Charlottetown